This is a list of feature films (excluding documentaries) either partially or wholly based on events in the Korean War, arranged by country of production.

South Korea

Piagol (피아골), 1955
Five Marines (오인의 해병), 1961
The Marines Who Never Returned (돌아오지 않는 해병), 1963
Red Scarf (빨간 마후라), 1963
Flame in the Valley (산불), 1967
Soldiers Without Fault (죄없는 병사들), 1989
Nambugun (남부군), 1990
Silver Stallion (은마는 오지 않는다), 1991
Spring in My Hometown (아름다운 시절), 1998The Last Witness (흑수선), 2001Taegukgi: The Brotherhood of War (태극기 휘날리며), 2004Welcome to Dongmakgol ('웰컴 투 동막골), 2005
A Little Pond (작은 연못), 2009
71: Into the Fire (포화 속으로), 2010
In Love and War (적과의 동침), 2011
The Front Line (고지전), 2011
Ode to My Father (국제시장), 2014
Northern Limit Line (연평해전), 2015
The Long Way Home (서부전선), 2015
Operation Chromite (인천상륙작전), 2016
Swing Kids (스윙키즈), 2018
The Battle of Jangsari (장사리: 잊혀진 영웅들), 2019

North Korea 
Unsung Heroes (1978–1981)
Wolmi Island (1982)
From 5 p.m. to 5 a.m. (1990)

United States 

The Steel Helmet, 1951
Fixed Bayonets!, 1951
A Yank in Korea, 1951
Korea Patrol, 1951
I Want You, 1951
Tokyo File 212, 1951
Submarine Command, 1951
Japanese War Bride, 1952
Mr. Walkie Talkie, 1952
Retreat, Hell!, 1952
One Minute to Zero, 1952
Battle Zone, 1952
Flat Top, 1952
Battle Circus, 1953
Flight Nurse, 1953
Combat Squad, 1953
Sabre Jet, 1953
The Glory Brigade, 1953
Mission Over Korea, 1953
Sky Commando, 1953
Take the High Ground!, 1953
Cease Fire, 1953
The Bamboo Prison, 1954
Prisoner of War, 1954
Dragonfly Squadron, 1954
Men of the Fighting Lady, 1954
The Bridges at Toko-Ri, 1954
Love Is a Many-Splendored Thing, 1955
Air Strike, 1955
The McConnell Story, 1955
Hell's Horizon, 1955
Target Zero, 1955
Hold Back the Night, 1956
The Rack, 1956
Men in War, 1957
Battle Hymn, 1957
Sayonara, 1957
Time Limit, 1957
Tank Battalion, 1958
The Hunters, 1958
Battle Flame, 1959
Pork Chop Hill, 1959
Operation Dames, 1959
All the Young Men, 1960
Cry for Happy, 1961
Marines, Let's Go, 1961
Sniper's Ridge, 1961
The Manchurian Candidate, 1962
The Nun and the Sergeant, 1962
War Hunt, 1962
The Hook, 1963
War Is Hell, 1963
The Young and The Brave, 1963
Iron Angel, 1964
No Man's Land, 1964
Sergeant Ryker, 1968 (originally broadcast on television as "The Case Against Paul Ryker", a 1963 two-part episode of Kraft Suspense Theatre) 
M*A*S*H, 1970
The Reluctant Heroes, 1971
MacArthur, 1977
Inchon 1981 (joint US-ROK production)
For The Boys, 1991
Devotion, 2022

China
Battle on Shangganling Mountain (上甘岭), 1956
Power Fighter in Vast Sky, 1976
Assembly, 2005
My War, 2016
The Sacrifice, 2020
The Battle at Lake Changjin, 2021
The Battle at Lake Changjin II, 2022
Sniper, 2022

Philippines 
Korea, 1986

Netherlands 
Field of honour (Het veld van eer), 1986 (Dutch/South Korean Co-Production)

Turkey 
Ayla: The Daughter of War, 2017

United Kingdom
A Hill in Korea, 1956

References
 

List
Korean War